An election to the electoral county of Fingal within Dublin County to Dublin County Council took place on 27 June 1991 as part of that year's Irish local elections. 24 councillors were elected from 6 local electoral areas on the system of proportional representation by means of the single transferable vote for a five-year term of office. It was one of three electoral counties within Dublin County at this election, the others being Dún Laoghaire–Rathdown and South Dublin.

The electoral county had been established in 1985 as Dublin–Fingal and was renamed Fingal for these local elections.

From 1 January 1994, on the coming into effect of the Local Government (Dublin) Act 1993, County Dublin was disestablished as an administrative county, and in its place the electoral counties became three new counties. The councillors listed below became the councillors for Fingal County Council from that date.

Results by party

Results by Electoral Area

Balbriggan

Castleknock

Howth

Malahide

Mulhuddart

Swords

References

External links
 Official website
 irishelectionliterature

1991 Irish local elections
1991